178th meridian may refer to:

178th meridian east, a line of longitude east of the Greenwich Meridian
178th meridian west, a line of longitude west of the Greenwich Meridian